Melica frutescens, the woody melicgrass, is a species of grass found in Arizona and California in the United States and in Mexico.

Description
The species' lateral branches are sparse with leaf-sheaths being scabrous, tubular and closed. They are comprised out of 3–6 fertile florets which are diminished at the apex. Both lower and upper glumes are chartaceous, elliptic and keelless with acute apexes. Flowers are fleshy, oblong, truncate and grow together. They also have 3 anthers with fruits that are caryopses and have an additional pericarp.

References

frutescens
Flora of Mexico
Flora of Arizona
Flora of California
Flora without expected TNC conservation status